Jelonek is the debut instrumental album by Polish violinist Jelonek. It was released on December 3, 2007 on Mystic Production.

A music video was shot for the song "BaRock".

Track listing

Personnel

References
     

Art rock albums
Progressive rock albums by Polish artists
Progressive metal albums by Polish artists
2007 debut albums
Mystic Production albums
Instrumental rock albums